The Great Mind Challenge (TGMC)  is an annual nationwide software development competition, created by the Academic Initiative of IBM. The competition currently takes place in India, Israel, China, Ireland and Switzerland; outside of India, the effort is known as the IBM Great Minds Program.

History 

The Academic Initiative is an educational enterprise established by IBM that includes an online portal that provides access to software downloads, hardware, training, and course materials, most at no charge. Through the website, IBM provides resources for integration into college curricula to help teach students how to master open technologies. The Academic Initiative addresses the need for companies to collaborate with academia to develop IT talent and drive IT to smaller towns.

The Academic Initiative programs include various student and university engagements designed to encourage innovation in the technology space at the university level and to enable students to become market-ready. 

The Great Mind Challenge (TMGC) was launched in 2004 by the Academic Initiative of IBM in India. TGMC's was created with a focus on the need to better educate millions of students for a more competitive information technology (IT) workforce by partnering with colleges and universities. Each year, the number of participants and participating colleges increases. TGMC is now one of the largest nationwide student competitions in India.

The Great Minds Program started in Zurich in 2007 and since then has rolled out to include Haifa, Dublin and China.

Concept 

The Great Mind Challenge is open exclusively to students across India, who in order to participate, have to form teams within their respective colleges. Colleges with registered teams eventually meet in competition for the winning project. Each team is constituted by one faculty member and a max of four students. The teams must develop innovative solutions using open standards-based IT tools, solely from IBM, in complex real-time situations.

It is aimed mainly at students from Indian engineering colleges, who can develop solutions for real-time problems and scenarios with the use of IBМ software in the project being compulsory. TGMC is also utilized as a meeting ground for large IT corporations in search of young talent and students from smaller universities looking for recruitment opportunities.

The IBM Research Labs in Haifa, Dublin, and Zurich host a similar competition for 3 to 6-month internships at IBM Research in the respective cities for students from central and eastern Europe, the Middle East and Africa. It provides students with an opportunity to work alongside world-class scientists in the leading industrial IT research organization. The competition is open to any full-time student enrolled in a Master's or Ph.D. program in Computer Science, Electrical Engineering, Physics, Software Engineering, Industrial Engineering, or Service Science at the time of application.

The Challenge 

All potential teams require one faculty member and can be consisted of members from juniors and seniors. The first phase consists of developing a quality Software Requirement Specification document. Other considerations include technology, use of XML, quality code, and design tools are given scores based upon the usage. The second phase includes the support of regional languages and portability issues of the software developed regarding functionality, User Interface, and output.

A face to face evaluation round is carried out by IBM for the top 300 projects. The evaluation round is attended by the entire team and interviewed by IBM personnel. The Academic Initiative provides resources such as free software download, online tutoring, discussion boards, training seminars and IBM mentors to guide teams through the process of the competition. The top 20 teams are invited every year to attend the closing ceremony where the winners from India are announced. The Top 3 projects are kept in a special category called TGMC "HALL OF FAME" whereupon the team's work and their names are kept in permanent records of IBM. All the Top-20 teams are awarded prizes based upon their rank.

Тhe Haifa, Dublin and Zurich program, is open to students enrolled in a Master's or PhD program in computer science, electrical engineering, physics, software engineering, industrial engineering, and service science in central or eastern Europe, the Middle East or Afric

Awards and recognition

TGMC has been awarded the Limca Book of Records award for the largest student competition for engineering students, with approximately 1,10,000 participants from over 1,000 colleges in 2010.

IBM Developer works the site that lead to successful discovery of knowledge on IBM tools for TGMC is declared as the largest used e-learning system in India by Limca book of records for the year 2011.

Past winners 

Outstanding Performing College/Institute

Maharishi Arvind Institute of Science and Management, Jaipur under the leadership of D.P. Sharma was awarded 8th time continuously from 2005–2013 in the category of the Best Performing College in India. Later, DP Sharma got a Grant Award and nominated as National Academic Ambassador (AI) for Cloud Computing offering by IBM-USA for his consistent efforts and support to the TGMC mission.

2011

 Winners - TechnoMovers from Tirumala Engineering College, Andhra Pradesh - Paperless Hospital Service, Team Members - Shiva Gouraram, Mounika Narsingoze, Wasim Malik and Anil Talla along with the mentor of the team Laxmaiah Mettu.

Esperantos from SMEC, Chennai - 'One for all, All for one -  Women Empowerment project', Team  Members: AjithPrasad, Manish Verma.

2010

 Winners - KMIT chargers from KMIT, Andhra Pradesh - Internet Banking System, Team Members - Mohana Krishna Chaturvedula and Anumula Kalyan Vekatesh along with the mentor of the team Deepa Ganu.
 1st Runners-up - Scriptcoders from Madras Institute of Technology, Tamil Nadu - Project chess master, Team Members - Venkatesh, Vardhan, Suresh Rathnaraj C & Satish with the mentor of the team Rajesh G.
 2nd Runners-up - KP's eagle software solutions from KL University, Andhra Pradesh- Knowledge based community sharing system, Team members- Lokala Karthick, P.D.K Pavan Kumar and R.V. Prasanth Kumar with the mentor of the team K.V.D Kiran.

2009
 Winners - StarGazers from Sastra University, Tamil Nadu - Online Library Management Systems
 1st Runners-up - Azuresky from M.V.J.College of Engineering, Bangalore, Karnataka - Online National Polling
 2nd Runners-up - Resilience from Thiagarajar College of Engineering, Tamil Nadu - E-cops
 3rd Runners-up - Corrupt from JSS Academy Of Technical Education Noida, Uttar Pradesh -  E-Cops

2008
 Winners: Ambidextrous - KLN College of Engineering, Tamil Nadu - My Mission - City Without Crime
 1st Runners-up - Coderz - JSS Academy of Technical Education, Uttar Pradesh - Virtual Classroom System
 2nd Runners-up - Resilience - Thiagarajar College of Engineering, Tamil Nadu - Manage Prisons
 3rd Runners-up - Lonely Thinkers - Thangavelu Engineering College, Tamil Nadu - My Mission City Without Crime

2007
 Winners - Ambidextrous from K.L.N. College Of Engineering, Tamil Nadu - District Collectorate Office Information integration
 1st Runners-up - Gvccchallenger from Department of Computer Science, Gujarat - Vehicle identification
 2nd Runners-up - Web Masons from Amrita School Of Engineering (Deemed University), Tamil Nadu - Vehicle identification

TGMC in education 

Certain colleges have approved of TGMC projects as suitable for assessment purposes and have integrated them into their curricula. Below is a list of such colleges:
	
 A D Patel Institute of Technology, Anand
 Amity University, Noida
 Amrita University, Coimbatore
 Amrita School of Arts & Science, Mysore
 Bapuji Institute of Engineering & Technology, Davangere
 Bhagwan Parshuram Institute of Technology, Delhi
 Bharat Institute of Technology, Meerut (U.P.)
 Bhiwani Institute of Technology & Science, Bhiwani
 Birla Institute of Technology, Mesra
 CMRIT, Bangalore
 Dayananda Sagar College of engineering, Bangalore
 Dr. D.Y. Patil College of Engg., Pune
 Dr. MGR University, Chennai
 Dronacharya College of Engineering and Technology, Gurgaon
 Gurgaon Institute of Technology & Management, Gurgaon
 Engineering College, Bikaner, Rajasthan
 ER & DCIIT College of Engg., Kerala
 International School of informatics & Management, Jaipur, Rajasthan
 Jaipur National University, Rajasthan.
 Jayamukhi Institute of Technology, Warangal
 JSS Academy Of Technical Education, Noida
 K L N College Of Engineering, Madurai
 KL University, Vijayawada, Andhra Pradesh
 Kavikulguru Institute of Technology & Science, Ramtek (Nagpur)
 Lachoo Memorial College, Jodhpur
 Lakshmi Narain College of Technology, Bhopal, Madhya Pradesh 
 Laxmi Devi Institute of Engineering and Technology, Alwar, Rajasthan
 Maharaj Surajmal Institute of Technology, Janakpuri, New Delhi
 Maharaja Agrasen Institute of Technology, Delhi
 Maharishi Arvind Institute of Science and Management, Jaipur was awarded 8th time continuously for the Best Performing College in India
 Maharishi Arvind Institute of Engineering & Technology, Jaipur
 Manav Rachna College, Faridabad
 MBM Engineering College, Jai Narayan Vyas University, Jodhpur
 Meerut Institute Of Engineering & Technology, (Meerut), U.P.
 MLR Institute of Technology
 Model Engineering College, Kerala
 National Institute of Engineering, Mysore
 Pimpri College of Engineering, Pune
 Poornima College Of Engineering, Jaipur
 Poornima Institute of Engineering & Technology, Jaipur
 Poornima Group of Institutions, Jaipur
 Rajagiri School of Engg. & Technology, Kerala
 Rukmini Devi Institute of Advanced Studies, Delhi
 Sanghvi Institute of Management, Indore
 Shree Budha College of Engineering, Kerala
 Shree Chitra Tirunal College of Engineering, Kerala
 Siddhi Vinayak College of Engineering and Technology, Gurgaon
 Sinhgad Institute of Technology, Lonavala
 Singhad College of Engineering, Pune
 South Point Women's Institute of Engineering & Technology, Haryana
 Thiagarajar College Of Engineering, Madurai
 Thiagarajar School Of Management, Madurai
 TOCH Institute of Science & Technology, Kerala
 Guruvga Institute of Typing Torture
 G1E Institute of Virus and Sciences
 Mewar University, Rajasthan

References

Great Mind Challenge